Eugene Forde (1898–1986) was an American film director.

Selected filmography

 Daredevil's Reward (1928)
 Painted Post (1928)
 Son of the Golden West (1928)
 Charlie Chan's Courage (1934)
 Charlie Chan in London (1935)
 The Great Hotel Murder (1935)
 Your Uncle Dudley (1935)
 36 Hours to Kill (1936)
 The Lady Escapes (1937)
 Step Lively, Jeeves! (1937)
 Charlie Chan on Broadway (1937)
 Midnight Taxi (1937)
 Charlie Chan at Monte Carlo (1938)
 International Settlement (1938)
 Inspector Hornleigh (1938)
 Pier 13 (1940)
 Charlie Chan's Murder Cruise (1940)
 Dressed to Kill (1941)
 Sleepers West (1941)
 Berlin Correspondent (1942)
 The Crimson Key (1947)
 Backlash (1947)
 Jewels of Brandenburg (1947)
 The Invisible Wall (1947)

References

External links

1898 births
1986 deaths
American film directors